The following is a list of county routes in Morris County in the U.S. state of New Jersey.

500-series county routes
In addition to those listed below, the following 500-series county routes serve Morris County:
CR 504, CR 510, CR 511, CR 511 Alt, CR 512, CR 513, CR 517, CR 525, CR 531

Other county routes

See also

References

 
Morris